Jean Prodromidès (3 July 1927 – 17 March 2016) was a French composer. He was born in Neuilly-sur-Seine in 1927 in a music-loving family. His father, of Greek origin, had a pianola by which he became familiar with works of Beethoven and Wagner. He was a pupil of René Leibowitz, who introduced him to dodecaphonic and serial composition. Together with other Leibowitz pupils, Serge Nigg, Antoine Duhamel and André Casanova, he gave the first performance of Leibowitz's Explications des Metaphors, Op. 15, in Paris in 1948.

Prodromidès composed for films such as Maigret et l'Affaire Saint-Fiacre and Danton. Prodromidés was elected to the Académie des Beaux-Arts in 1990 to Henry Sauguet's seat; Prodromidès was also president of the Academy and the Institut de France in 2005.

Selected filmography
1956: Les biens de ce monde
1959: Archimède le clochard
1960: The Baron of the Locks (a.k.a. Le Baron de l'écluse)
1960: Le Voyage en ballon (a.k.a. Stowaway in the Sky)
1960: Blood and Roses (a.k.a. Et mourir de plaisir)
1967: Pillaged (a.k.a. Mise à sac), dir. Alain Cavalier
1969     Salome , dir. Pierre Karolnik
1983: Danton, dir. Andrzej Wajda

References

Discography 
Prodromidès's complete score, Le Voyage en ballon, has been released on CD by Disques Cinémusique in 2009. More information here.

External links
 

1927 births
2016 deaths
People from Neuilly-sur-Seine
French people of Greek descent
French film score composers
French opera composers
French male film score composers
Members of the Académie des beaux-arts